is a JR West Sanin Main Line (Senzaki Branch Line) station located in Nagato, Yamaguchi Prefecture, Japan, having one set of track and a side platform.

Senzaki Station started its operation on May 15, 1930.

Adjacent stations

External links 
  Senzaki Station (JR West)

Sanin Main Line
Railway stations in Yamaguchi Prefecture
Railway stations in Japan opened in 1930
Stations of West Japan Railway Company